Frances Boothby (fl. 1669–1670) was an English playwright and the first woman to have a play professionally produced in London.

Life
Little is known of Boothby's life but the dedications of her two extant works have led to speculation that she may have been the daughter of Walter Boothby, a "prosperous merchant" with aristocratic connections.

Boothby is mainly remembered for her tragicomedy Marcelia, or, The Treacherous Friend (licensed 1669; published 1670). It was performed by the King's Company at the Theatre Royal, probably in August 1669. The published play is dedicated to Lady Mary Yate, of Harvington Hall in Worcestershire, whom she addresses as her kinswoman.

Marcelia is "a conservative work." The plot involves romantic difficulties and deceit in love precipitated by a king who abandons his lover to pursue the heroine. As order is reestablished by the end, full-blown tragedy is avoided. Audiences likely perceived implicit criticism of King Charles II in the character of the lustful king; such criticism of the monarch was "widespread, but as yet tactful."

Boothby's only other known work is a poem, addressed to her cousin Anne Somerset (née Aston), which laments the failure of her play, though one scholar writes that the play went off "with some success." She also left a collection of recipes.

Works
Marcelia: or the Treacherous Friend. A Tragicomedy. As it is Acted at the Theatre-Royal, by His Majesties Servants. Written by Mrs. F. Boothby. Licenc'd, October 9, 1669. Roger L'Estrange. London: Printed for Will. Cademan at the Popes-Head in the lower Walk of the New-Exchange, and Giles Widdowes at the Maiden-head in Aldersgate-street, 1670: Etext, British Library

Notes

References
Brown, Susan, et al. "Frances Boothby." Orlando: Women's Writing in the British Isles from the Beginnings to the Present. Ed. Susan Brown, Patricia Clements, and Isobel Grundy. Cambridge University Press. Cambridge UP, n.d. 22 Mar. 2013. Accessed 9 Sept. 2022.
Corporaal, Marguérite. Love, Death and Resurrection in Tragicomedies by Seventeenth-Century English Women Dramatists. Early Modern Literary Studies 12.1 (May, 2006) 3.1-24
Hughes, Derek. Boothby, Frances (fl. 1669–1670). Oxford Dictionary of National Biography. Ed. H. C. G. Matthew and Brian Harrison. Oxford: OUP, 2004. 16 November 2006
 London Stage Database. "London Stage Event: August 1669 at The (first) Drury Lane Theatre." Accessed 9 September 2022.
 Todd, Janet M. "Boothby, Frances (fl. 1669)." A Dictionary of British and American women writers, 1660-1800. Totowa, N.J.: Rowman & Allanheld, 1985, p. 52. (Etexte, Internet Archive]).
Wynne-Davies, Marion. Boothby, Frances (1669) English Restoration dramatist. Dictionary of English Literature. Bloomsbury, 1997

External links

17th-century English dramatists and playwrights
17th-century English women writers
17th-century English writers
English women dramatists and playwrights
Year of birth unknown
Year of death unknown